Pachybrachis bullatus, the bubble-banded pachy, is a species of case-bearing leaf beetle in the family Chrysomelidae. It is found in North America.

References

Further reading

 

bullatus
Articles created by Qbugbot
Beetles described in 1915